DL&W station is a Buffalo Metro Rail light rail indoor station currently under construction. It is planned for the first floor on the Buffalo River side of the former Delaware, Lackawanna and Western Railroad terminal, which currently serves as the NFTA Rail Maintenance Yard. This station will eliminate the Special Events station and provide commuters access to parking and Metro Rail service to the city, and a direct pedestrian walkway to Canalside areas.

References 

Railway stations scheduled to open in 2023
Buffalo Metro Rail stations
Railway stations under construction in the United States